Trillectro Music Festival is a Washington, D.C.-based music festival founded in 2012. The annual single-day outdoor gathering features hip-hop, electronic, R&B and indie rock acts and is lauded for showcasing up-and-coming musicians on the eve of their big break.

History
Organized by DC to BC, a music-marketing group started by three area natives, Trillectro is recognized as the area's first hip-hop and electronic music festival. The name Trillectro, a portmanteau of “trill” (meaning “authentic” in hip-hop circles) and “electro” (short for “electronic”), embodies the festival's credo of bridging the gap between music genres. Beyond music, the festival is also known as a showcase for local talent, including artists, vendors and small businesses.

2012

The inaugural Trillectro was held on August 11, 2012 at The Half Street Fairgrounds near Nationals Park and featured two stages.

Acts:   
 Schoolboy Q
 Casey Veggies
 Flosstradamus
 Tabi Bonney
 Tittsworth
 Oddisee
 Body Language
 DJ Wonder
 Cam Jus
 Brenton Duvall
 DJ Underdog
 ASAAD
 Gianni Lee
 DJ Money
 Beyond Modern
 Rex Riot + Basscamp 
 Grande Marshall
 Locke Kaushal
 Nouveau Riche
 Phony Ppl
 Flatbush Zombies
 Brenmar
 DJ David Heartbreak
 Doug E. Fresh (Host)

2013

Trillectro 2013 was held on August 17 at The Half Street Fairgrounds near Nationals Park. The second year experienced a more than 100% growth rate, partially attributed to the organizers used of “crowdspeaking” platform Thunderclap. The social media campaign exceeded its supporter goal by 32% and reached over 5 million people.

Acts:
 Wale (special guest)  
 A$AP Rocky (surprise guest)
 A$AP Ferg
 Casey Veggies
 Travi$ Scott
 Fat Trel
 King Chip
 Shy Glizzy
 Tittsworth
 Nadastrom
 Phil Ade
 Ghost Beach
 DJ Sliink
 Gent & Jawns
 Goldroom
 Salva
 DJ Spicoli
 Misun
 Alex Young
 Venus X
 Two-9
 RDGLDGRN
 New Retro
 Carnage
 Lowkey and Ashley Outrageous (Host)

2014
To accommodate an expected rise in attendance, Trillectro 2014 moved to DC's historic RFK Stadium’s festival grounds and was held on August 23. In addition to the one-day event, the festival also hosted a handful of smaller parties throughout the week.

Acts:
 Big Sean
 Travi$ Scott (Surprise Guest)
 Migos
 Fat Trel
 Baauer
 Oddisee
 Rae Sremmurd
 Lunice
 Rome Fortune
 OG Maco
 SZA
 Lightshow
 Sango
 GoldLink
 Ras Nebyu
 The Beard & Th Fro
 Spinser Tracy
 Redline Graffiti
 Fortebowie
 The Jane Doze
 TWRK
 Falcons b2b Hoodboi
 Willy Joy
 DJ Money
 Dirty South Joe
 Dougie F & DJ Fire
 Lowkey & YesJulz (Host)

2015
On July 8, festival organizers announced that Trillectro 2015 will be held on Saturday, August 29 at Merriweather Post Pavilion in Columbia, Maryland.

Acts:
 Chance the Rapper
 RL Grime
 Cashmere Cat
 Khelani
 JMSN
 DRAM
 Tunji Ige
 Chris McClenney
 Masego
 Babeo Baggins
 Mista Selecta
 Hi$to
 Nativeson
 Ayes Cold
 YesJulz (Host)

References

Music of Washington, D.C.
Electronic music festivals in the United States
Festivals in Washington, D.C.
2012 establishments in Washington, D.C.
Music festivals established in 2012
Performing arts in Washington, D.C.